Cochylimorpha kurdistana is a species of moth of the family Tortricidae. It is found in Iraq, Syria and Iran.

The wingspan is 21–26 mm. The ground colour of the forewings varies from cream and yellowish cream (with some rust-coloured spots) to greyish cream.

References

Moths described in 1959
Cochylimorpha
Moths of Asia